Enceladus is a moon of Saturn.

Enceladus may also refer to:

 Gaia Enceladus (or Enceladus Galaxy), the remains of a dwarf galaxy that merged with the Milky Way that was discovered by the Gaia space telescope
 Enceladus (giant), one of the Gigantes in Greek mythology
 Enceladus, son of Aegyptus, in Greek mythology
 Enceladus class cargo ship
 USS Enceladus (AK-80), an American cargo ship
 Enceladus Nunataks, Saturn Glacier, Alexander Island, Antarctica; the Enceladus ridge
 , a genus of beetle in the Siagoninae subfamily

See also